The Battle of Beit Imrin occurred on September 29, 1936 in Beit Imrin, when British forces besieged Arab forces operating under the command of Fawzi al-Qawuqji while in the village. The rebels withdrew after receiving heavy losses estimated at 42 dead.

References

1936–1939 Arab revolt in Palestine
1936 in Mandatory Palestine